In 2004–2005, there was a series of unusual fires in Canneto di Caronia, Sicily (Italy). While popular speculation ascribed the fires to various causes, including an unknown natural phenomenon,  paranormal events or secret military technology, an inquiry by a team of scientific experts in 2004 could not identify a plausible cause of the fires. A separate investigation by the office of prosecutor in 2008 was closed stating that the fires were cases of arson, although no persons responsible nor possible motive nor method for the arson were named by the prosecutor, and the verdict was directly at odds with the investigation by scientific experts in 2004.  In 2015 an arrest was made where 40 incidents could be linked to arson by a single person.

2003-4 events
Canneto di Caronia is a village in Sicily, home to roughly 150 people.

Events began on December 23, 2003, at Antonino Pezzino's home on Via Mare;  Pezzino's television reportedly exploded. Similar malfunctions reportedly affected fuse boxes, air conditioners, kitchen appliances, computers, and electronic car door locks. Fires were also said to have struck wedding presents and a piece of furniture. At least one person was said to have observed an unplugged electrical cable ignite while he was directly observing it.

On February 9, 2004, two houses on Via Mare burned. In response, Mayor Spinnato issued an order evacuating the 39 residents of Via Mare from their homes to the town's only hotel. ENEL, the Italian power utility, cut power to the town, but fires continued. From January through to March, 92 fires were reported.

On February 11, an investigation was announced by the local prosecutor. On March 16, fires resumed, and investigators reportedly witnessed malfunctions in compasses, electronic car locks, and cell phones.

In April, the government formed an interdisciplinary research group, coordinated by Francesco Venerando Mantegna from the Sicilian Protezione Civile. That team reportedly had widespread cooperation from the nation's armed forces, police, as well as utilities. Venerando's team reported anomalous 'electromagnetic activity', unexplained lights, and a helicopter that experienced allegedly-anomalous rotor damage.  Scientists from the National Research Institute (CNR), with the support of NASA physicists, were also involved in investigating the events.

In June 2004, residents were returned to their homes on Via Mare.
 
Explanations for the events have ranged from the mundane to the paranormal. Public speculation attributed the events to poltergeists, demons, or UFOs.  In 2007 it was proposed that the phenomena were caused by intermittent electromagnetic emissions. On 24 June 2008, following further investigation by the appointed experts, the case was dismissed by the prosecutor of Mistretta. The conclusion of the prosecutor was that the fires were arson cases, although no responsible persons for the arson were named by the prosecutor.

2014-15 events
Mysterious fires returned in mid-2014.
On March 5, 2015, police arrested and charged Giuseppe Pezzino, 26, with arson, conspiracy to commit fraud, and sounding a false alarm in association with the mysterious fires.  His father, Antonino Pezzino, has also been implicated.  The Italian military police had installed hidden cameras in the streets after the fires started again in July 2014.  Video captured about 40 incidents implicating Giuseppe (and occasionally, Antonino). Further evidence was gathered by phone taps.

In popular culture
The fires were featured in the US television program The Unexplained Files. In 2019, the fires were featured on the program Unidentified: Inside America's UFO Investigation.

References

21st century in Sicily
2004 fires in Europe
2005 fires in Europe
2004 disasters in Italy
2005 disasters in Italy
2004 in Italy
2005 in Italy
Arson in Italy